The City National Grove of Anaheim is an indoor, live music venue in Anaheim, California operated by Nederlander Concerts of Los Angeles. Its approximate capacity is 1,700.

The Grove sits on the northwest corner of the parking lot of Angel Stadium of Anaheim, home of Major League Baseball's Los Angeles Angels. It is also located near the Anaheim Regional Transportation Intermodal Center with  Amtrak and Metrolink service.

Having opened in 1998, the venue was originally opened as the ill-fated Tinseltown, an awards show-themed restaurant. After converting to a concert venue, it was temporarily renamed The Sun Theatre before changing its name to The Grove of Anaheim. On January 24, 2011, the venue again changed its name to City National Grove of Anaheim, following the agreement of a five-year, $1.25 million naming rights deal with City National Bank.

Among the artists that have performed here are Bob Dylan, B.B. King, Ray Davies, Jeff Beck & Johnny Depp, Air Supply, Chiquis, Enrique Bunbury, Julio Iglesias, 
Joe Satriani, Boz Scaggs, Halford, Merle Haggard, George Lopez, Jamie Foxx, Seal, MattyBRaps, Machine Gun Kelly (musician), Something Corporate, Live, Everclear, and Jaguares.

References

External links 
 

Music venues in California
Theatres in California
Buildings and structures in Anaheim, California
Culture of Anaheim, California
Tourist attractions in Anaheim, California